John Antioco is an American businessman, known for being the former CEO of Blockbuster Video who missed an opportunity to purchase Netflix before it became a multi-billion dollar streaming platform. He is now the chairman of the board of directors at Red Mango and the Managing Partner of JAMCO Interests LLC.

Biography
John Antioco was born and raised in Brooklyn, New York. His father was a milkman, whom Antioco would sometimes accompany on his morning delivery route.  He is a graduate of the New York Institute of Technology, where he earned a B.S. in Business Administration.

Antioco is best known for declining an offer, from Reed Hastings, to purchase Netflix for $50 million in 2000, while CEO of Blockbuster. He also refused a proposal from Netflix to run Blockbuster's online presence.

John Antioco was a member of the board of governors of the Boys & Girls Clubs of America.

Career

7-Eleven

Antioco began his professional career at 7-Eleven, which he joined as a management trainee in 1970. He was at the company for 20 years, in various roles. As Senior Vice President of Marketing in April 1989, he was responsible for bringing on advertising firm J. Walter Thompson to create a slate of television commercials that marketed 7-Eleven to new-collar workers. Antioco was also Senior Vice President of Operations, which meant he was in charge of operations for every 7-Eleven store worldwide.

Pearle Vision, Circle-K, and Taco Bell

Antioco left 7-Eleven in 1990 to become COO at Pearle Vision. 

In 1991, he joined the convenience store chain Circle K, where he assumed the role of president and COO. Circle K had filed for bankruptcy in May of 1990 and Antioco was brought in to streamline the company's operations.  Under Antioco's leadership, the chain announced plans to close or sell about 1,550 of its least profitable locations and invest in improving the rest of its stores. In March 1992, at which point Antioco had become the company's CEO, Circle K was sold for approximately $425 million to a private investor group led by management in conjunction with Investcorp. In 1994, as CEO Antioco took Circle K public, selling 6.5 million shares of stock on the New York Stock Exchange. Antioco left Circle K in 1996, shortly after overseeing a $710 million sale of the company to Tosco Corp.

Antioco joined Taco Bell as its new CEO in 1996. During his time at Taco Bell, he oversaw changes to the company's menu, advertising, and its franchising model.

Blockbuster

Antioco took over as Blockbuster CEO in July 1997. When he joined the company, it was struggling financially, with cash flow down 70 percent during the second quarter of the 1997 financial year. This was in part due to Blockbuster's expansions into areas outside the video retail market, such apparel sales and a chain of music stores called Blockbuster Music. Antioco decoupled Blockbuster Music from its video division, putting it under separate management. The music store division was sold in August 1998 by Blockbuster's parent company Viacom to Wherehouse Entertainment for $115 million. Early in Antioco's CEO tenure, Blockbuster also ended its relationships with Virgin Interactive, Discovery Zone, and Spelling Entertainment.

In 1998, Antioco entered Blockbuster into revenue-sharing agreements with Hollywood studios, which allowed its stores to obtain many copies of new releases at a lower price than their competitors. In August 1999, Antioco took Blockbuster public, selling 18 percent of its stock on the New York Stock Exchange and raising $465 million. On the day of the initial public offering, he rang the opening bell of the NYSE alongside actress Rene Russo. At the time, Blockbuster's market share in the video rental space had recently grown to 31 percent.

In 2004, Antioco oversaw the launch of a new DVD subscription service called Blockbuster Online. The service allowed customers to rent Blockbuster DVDs online and have them delivered by mail. By the end of 2006, Blockbuster Online had approximately two million subscribers. In 2007, Antioco pushed to expand the service and rebranded it as Blockbuster Total Access, which in addition to offering online DVD rentals, also allowed customers to return a Blockbuster Online DVD to a brick and mortar Blockbuster store to receive one additional free rental.

Under Antioco, Blockbuster launched these services in part to compete with Netflix, which at the time was a growing competitor in the video retail space. It has been widely reported that, in 2000, Netflix co-founders Reed Hastings and Marc Randolph offered to sell their company to Blockbuster for $50 million, but Antioco declined. Hastings and Randolph have also claimed this in books and interviews. Antioco has disputed this version of events, stating that he never had serious discussions with Hastings or Randolph about acquiring Netflix. In 2007, at the Sundance Film Festival, Antioco and Hastings met to discuss the possibility of Netflix purchasing Blockbuster Online. Antioco preferred a full merger, and a deal between the two companies was never struck.

Antioco left Blockbuster in 2007 due to disagreements with Blockbuster board members, most notably billionaire investor Carl Icahn, over disagreements about company strategy.

JAMCO and other roles

In February 2010, Antioco founded JAMCO Interests, a private equity firm that invests in retail and hospitality ventures. JAMCO, through its subsidiary Brix Holdings, holds an interest in chain restaurants such as Red Mango, Souper Salad, and Friendly's, which it purchased in 2020 for $2 million following the chain's bankruptcy. JAMCO is also a member of TriArtisan Partners, an investment group that owns TGI Fridays, where Antioco served as interim CEO in 2015. He was also CEO of P.F. Chang's for approximately one year, following the company's acquisition by TriArtisan Partners. Antioco is currently chairman of Red Mango, a position he has held since 2008. 

In August 2011, Antioco was appointed chairman of the board at Rave Cinemas. He was chairman when Rave sold 32 of its theaters to Cinemark in November 2012 for approximately $240 million.

References

External links
How I Did It: Blockbuster’s Former CEO on Sparring with an Activist Shareholder
Bloomberg profile no longer valid**
A Look Back At Why Blockbuster Really Failed And Why It Didn’t Have To
Former Blockbuster CEO tells his side of Netflix story
Former rival's advice to Netflix: 'Don't let Icahn get to you'
Ex-Blockbuster Boss John Antioco Tapped As Chairman Of Board At Rave Cinemas
JOHN F. ANTIOCO profile at The Wall Street Transcript
Executive Profile - CIC Advantage Holdings LLC - John F. Antioco - Customer Intelligence

New York Institute of Technology alumni
Living people
1949 births